Mumtaz Begum (born 1956) is a former mayor of Bangalore, India. She was Bangalore's 
first Muslim mayor,
fourth woman mayor,
43rd mayor and was elected on 30 November 2005.

She had been elected as a corporator of the Bangalore Mahanagara Palike (BMP)thrice. She represented Shivajinagar Ward, which was part of British Cantonment during the colonial rule. A member of the Indian National Congress party, she was elected as a deputy mayor of Bangalore City Corporation in 1984, when she contested as a candidate of the Janata Party platform.

Political career
Mumtaz Begum was in Janatha Party when she got elected as Corporator for the first time in 1984 and elected as Deputy Mayor in 1984. Thereafter she migrated to the Congress party in 1988 and got elected as Corporator for the second time in 1990.

Posts Held
1984 : Deputy Mayor, Bangalore
1991–95 : General Secretary, Ladies Wing, Karnataka Pradesh Congress Committee
1993–97 : President, Block Congress Committee, Shivajinagar, Bangalore
1995–97 : General Secretary, Bangalore City District Congress Committee
1997–2002 : General Secretary, Karnataka Pradesh Congress Committee
2001 : Chairperson, Standing Committee on Appeals
2003 : Member, Standing Committee on Education and Social Justice
2002–2005 : Executive Committee Member, Karnataka Pradesh Congress Committee
2005–2006: Mayor, Bangalore Mahanagara Palike (BMP)

World Mayor nominee
Mumtaz Begum was in the list of finalists for World Mayor title of 2006, conducted once in two years by City Mayors Foundation, London.

References

20th-century Indian Muslims
21st-century Indian Muslims
1956 births
Living people
Mayors of Bangalore
Women mayors of places in Karnataka
Indian National Congress politicians from Karnataka
21st-century Indian women politicians
21st-century Indian politicians
20th-century Indian women politicians
20th-century Indian politicians
Women members of the Karnataka Legislative Assembly